The 4 arrondissements of the Alpes-de-Haute-Provence department are:
 Arrondissement of Barcelonnette, (subprefecture: Barcelonnette) with 14 communes. The population of the arrondissement was 7,874 in 2016.  
 Arrondissement of Castellane, (subprefecture: Castellane) with 41 communes.  The population of the arrondissement was 11,403 in 2016.  
 Arrondissement of Digne-les-Bains, (prefecture of the Alpes-de-Haute-Provence department: Digne-les-Bains) with 46 communes.  The population of the arrondissement was 47,298 in 2016.  
 Arrondissement of Forcalquier, (subprefecture: Forcalquier) with 97 communes.  The population of the arrondissement was 95,990 in 2016.

History

In 1800 the arrondissements of Digne, Barcelonnette, Castellane, Forcalquier and Sisteron were established. The arrondissements of Castellane and Sisteron were disbanded in 1926. Then, The arrondissement of Castellane was restored in 1942.

The borders of the arrondissements of Alpes-de-Haute-Provence were modified in January 2017:
 nine communes from the arrondissement of Digne-les-Bains to the arrondissement of Castellane
 16 communes from the arrondissement of Digne-les-Bains to the arrondissement of Forcalquier
 six communes from the arrondissement of Forcalquier to the arrondissement of Digne-les-Bains

References

Alpes-de-Haute-Provence